A Galilean is a person from Galilee, a region of northern Israel and southern Lebanon

Galilean may also refer to:
 Related to Galilee 
 Jesus, who was raised in Galilee
 Galilean dialect, the form of Jewish Palestinian Aramaic spoken by people in Galilee during the late Second Temple period
 Galilean faith, ancient name for Christianity
 Related to Galileo Galilei, early modern Italian natural philosopher
 Galilean moons, the four largest moons of Jupiter, discovered by Galileo
 Galilean telescope, early refracting telescope design used by Galileo
 Galilean binoculars, designed on the same principle as the Galilean telescope
 Galilean cannon, a device that demonstrates conservation of linear momentum
 Galilean thermometer, a sealed glass cylinder containing a clear liquid and several glass vessels of varying density
 Galilean invariance, states that the laws of motion are the same in all inertial frames
 Galilean transformation, used to transform between the coordinates of two reference frames which differ only by constant relative motion
 Galilean equivalence principle, universality of free fall
 Galilean electromagnetism, a formal electromagnetic field theory that is consistent with Galilean invariance

See also
 Emperor and Galilean, a play by Henrik Ibsen
 Jose the Galilean, a Jewish sage who lived in the 1st and 2nd centuries CE
 Judas the Galilean, a Jewish leader who led resistance to the census imposed for Roman tax purposes by Quirinius in Judea Province around 6 CE
 Against the Galileans, essay by the Roman emperor Julian the Apostate
 Galilee (disambiguation)
 Galileo (disambiguation)